Zach Azzanni (born August 10, 1976) is an American football coach who is the wide receivers coach for the New York Jets of the National Football League (NFL). Azzanni, who enters his 23rd season coaching wide receivers, previously coached with the Denver Broncos and spent the 2017 season with the Chicago Bears following 18 years at the college level.

Early years
Azzanni played college football as a wide receiver at Central Michigan University from 1994 to 1998.  He graduated from Central Michigan with a degree in sports management in 1999.

Coaching career

College
Azzanni began his coaching career as wide receivers coach for Valparaiso University in 1999. He spent two seasons there before working as a graduate assistant under Head Coach Urban Meyer at Bowling Green from 2001-02. Azzanni remained at Bowling Green after Meyer left to become Utah's head coach in 2003 and coached receivers for four seasons. Azzanni then served as the wide receivers coach, as well as the assistant head coach, at Central Michigan University. His CMU teams compiled a three-year record of 28–13, including three consecutive bowl appearances.

Azzanni was hired by Florida after the 2009 college regular season. In his first game coaching with the Gators—the 2010 Sugar Bowl—quarterback Tim Tebow threw for a career-high 482 yards in the Gators’ 51-24 win against Cincinnati. Azzanni then went on to be the offensive coordinator/wide receivers coach at Western Kentucky in 2011 for one season. In 2012, he spent one season coaching the wide receivers at the University of Wisconsin.

In 2013, Azzanni joined and spent four years at the University of Tennessee. He joined the Vols as wide receivers coach/recruiting coordinator before being promoted to passing game coordinator/wide receivers coach in 2015. Tennessee went to three consecutive bowl games from 2014-16, winning each contest and averaging nearly 43 points per outing. The Vols’ passing attack in 2016, which featured six different players with at least 200 yards receiving, helped the offense set school records for single-season points (473) and touchdowns (63).

NFL

Chicago Bears

The Bears hired Azzanni as their wide receivers coach for the 2017 season.

Denver Broncos
The Broncos hired Azzanni as their wide receivers coach on January 22, 2018.

New York Jets
The Jets hired Azzanni as their wide receivers coach on February 20, 2023.

Coaching success
Azzanni has experienced three Bowl seasons at Central Michigan, a BCS All State Sugar Bowl win, another Outback Bowl win at Florida, 2 Bowl wins while Wide Receiver's Coach at Bowling Green, including one over Big Ten Opponent Northwestern and a TaxSlayer Gator Bowl and Outback Bowl win at Tennessee against the Iowa Hawkeyes. Players he has coached include Antonio Brown (CMU), Charles Sharon (Bowling Green), and Western Kentucky running back Bobby Rainey.

References

1976 births
Living people
American football wide receivers
Bowling Green Falcons football coaches
Central Michigan Chippewas football coaches
Central Michigan Chippewas football players
Chicago Bears coaches
Denver Broncos coaches
Florida Gators football coaches
Tennessee Titans coaches
Tennessee Volunteers football coaches
Valparaiso Beacons football coaches
Western Kentucky Hilltoppers football coaches
Wisconsin Badgers football coaches